Alpine skiing at the 2019 Winter Deaflympics was held at the Valfurva  from 13 to 19 December 2019.

Medal table

Medal summary

Men

Women

References 

2019 in alpine skiing
2019 Winter Deaflympics events